William Deverell (born 1962) is a historian of the American West and a professor of history at the University of Southern California, where he directs the Huntington-USC Institute on California and the West, and is Chair of the department of History at Dornsife College and Arts and Sciences.

Education 
A native of California, William Deverell graduated A.B. from Stanford University in June 1983.  He decided to pursue a career as a historian, taking an MA at Princeton, and then staying on to complete a PhD in History.  As a Postdoctoral instructor Deverell came into contact with the Henry Huntington Library at Pasadena, California.

Career 
In 1990 he was appointed Assistant Professor at U.C. San Diego, and then four years later Associate Professor, before moving on to the California Institute of Technology.  In January 2004 he was the Professor of History for University of Southern California.  During his time at California’s universities he has become an acknowledged expert on the history of the 19th and 20th century West.

Since 2006 he has been on the Nominating Committee of the Western Historical Association.  In 2008 and 2009 he was asked by the California court to testify as an expert witness in San Jose v. Union Pacific Railroad Corporation.

From 2009-2010 he worked at Yale University as Beinecke Senior Fellow and Lamar Fellow attending his sabbatical year as a jobbing-professor at the famous Connecticut university.  In June 2011 he founded the Los Angeles Service Academy which is run with another historian.

In developing the famous library as a centre for historical studies, Deverell’s research has taken him into the golden period of post-Civil War history, from the Reconstruction Era through the Ranch and Cattle Wars of the later 19th century that culminated in the closing of the frontier, being awarded the Fletcher Jones Foundation Fellowship 2007-8.

Personal life 
In September 1995, Deverell married Jennifer Armstrong Watts, curator of historical photography, in Summit, New Jersey. They have three children and live at Pasadena, California.

Published works
Deverell has published several books in conjunction with others including: 
 Whitewashed Adobe: The Rise of Los Angeles and the Remaking of its Mexican Past which notes the role Hispanics have played in the history of the American West.
 Land of Sunshine: An Environmental History of Metropolitan Los Angeles charts the development of a great city and its impact on the land that was settled by its many different ethnic immigrants.
 Wiley Blackwell’s Companion to Los Angeles History, as well as Wiley Blackwell’s Companion to California History with Professor David Igler and published as a collaborative partnership with Professor Greg Hise.
 Form and Landscape: Southern California Edison and the Los Angeles Basin, 1940-1990, a physical book of the online exhibition of the same name (http://pstp-edison.com) showcasing essays and photographs curated from the Southern California Edition collection at The Huntington in collaboration with Professor Greg Hise.

References

External links
 
 
 

Living people
1962 births
Stanford University alumni
Princeton University alumni
University of Southern California faculty
Historians of the American West